Operation Petticoat is an American sitcom that was based on the 1959 film by the same name. It was broadcast on ABC for two seasons, from September 17, 1977 until October 16, 1978.

Overview
A submarine crew rescues a group of army nurses in the South Pacific in World War II and brings them aboard.  The submarine puts into dry dock for repainting, but a surprise attack while the repainting is incomplete forces the submarine to flee with the undercoat, which happens to be a shade of pink, not painted over.  The adventures of the pink submarine with a gaggle of young women on board constitute the rest of the series.

Cast
John Astin as Lt. Commander Matthew Sherman (season 1)
Melinda Naud as Lt. Dolores Crandall
Yvonne Wilder as Maj. Edna Howard (season 1)
Richard Gilliland as Lt. Nick Holden (season 1)
Dorrie Thomson as Lt. Ruth Colfax (season 1)
Jamie Lee Curtis as Lt. Barbara Duran (season 1)
Bond Gideon as Lt. Claire Reid (season 1)
Jim Varney as Seaman Broom
Don Sparks as Seaman Horner
Richard Brestoff as Yeoman Alvin Hunkle
Randolph Mantooth as Lt. Mike Bender (season 2)
Jo Ann Pflug as Lt. Katherine O'Hara (season 2)
Fred Kareman as Doplos (season 2)
Scott McGinnis as Seaman Dixon (season 2)
Robert Hogan as Lt. Commander Sam Haller (season 2)
Warren Berlinger as Chief Engineer Stanley Dobritch (season 2) 
Hilary Thompson as Lt. Betty Wheeler (season 2)

Production
Initially starring John Astin as Lieutenant Commander Sherman, the role Cary Grant played in the 1959 film, the television series also cast Tony Curtis' daughter, Jamie Lee Curtis, as Lieutenant Duran. Tony Curtis had appeared in the film version. Most of the show's cast was replaced for the show's second season.

Episodes

Television film

Season 1 (1977–78)

Season 2 (1978)

References

External links

1977 American television series debuts
1978 American television series endings
1970s American sitcoms
American Broadcasting Company original programming
Live action television shows based on films
English-language television shows
Military comedy television series
Nautical television series
Television series by Universal Television